General elections were held in Liberia on 2 May 1967. In the presidential election, incumbent William Tubman of the True Whig Party was the only candidate, and was re-elected unopposed.

Results

President

References

Liberia
General
Elections in Liberia
Single-candidate elections
Election and referendum articles with incomplete results